Lin Di (born 1975 in Shanghai) is a Chinese musician, composer, and vocalist.

Her current band is Cold Fairyland, a progressive rock band in which she plays pipa and keyboard synthesizers, and also sings.

Lin began playing pipa at the age of four. She studied at the Shanghai Conservatory of Music where she majored in traditional Chinese music and pipa. In 2001, she started her own band, Cold Fairyland, with bass guitarist Su Yong, and composed original music for various commercial projects and orchestral works. She performs occasionally with the Shanghai-based band Swing Shine.

Lin is also an avid photographer.

Discography

Solo albums 
Ten Days In Magic Land (魔境十日) by Lin Di - 2002
Bride in Legend (迷路新娘) by Lin Di - 2004
Meet in Secret Garden by Miyadudu - 2009
The Gossypium Era by Lin Di - 2011
Buddhist Scriptures by Lin Di - 2012
The One Tree Forest by Lin Di - 2021

With Swing Shine 
Marguerite  - 2011
Rootless Clouds  - 2013

With Cold Fairyland 
Flying Over the City (在城市上空飞翔) (demo) - 2001
Kingdom of Benevolent Strangers (陌生仙子国) - 2003
Cold Fairyland 2005 Live (冷酷仙境 2005现场) - 2006
Seeds on the Ground (地上的种子) - 2007

CDs are available from CDbaby.com. To stream online, please visit the artist's Bandcamp or Spotify.

Awards 
 2008 Shanghai City Weekend Magazine, Bar and Restaurant Awards, Editor's Pick - "The Best Locally Based Band"
 2009 China Music Awards - "Strength For New Life" Award

References

1975 births
Living people
Chinese male singer-songwriters
Musicians from Shanghai
People's Republic of China composers
Pipa players
Singers from Shanghai
21st-century Chinese women singers